Penicillium pullum is a species of fungus in the genus Penicillium.

References

pullum
Fungi described in 2002